Danny Phiri (born 25 July 1989) is a Zimbabwean professional footballer, who plays as a defensive midfielder for Golden Arrows and the Zimbabwe national team.

Club career
Phiri's youth career included spells with the junior sides of Amazulu and Railstars. In 2009, Phiri made the move into senior football when he agreed to join Bantu Rovers. He stayed with Bantu for two years before joining Chicken Inn. In 2015, he and Chicken Inn won the Zimbabwe Premier Soccer League and Phiri subsequently won the Soccer Star of the Year award.

In April 2016, Phiri, along with teammates Tafadzwa Kutinyu and Moses Demera, left Zimbabwe to attend a trial at Lamontville Golden Arrows.

International career
In January 2014, coach Ian Gorowa, invited him to be a part of the Zimbabwe squad for the 2014 African Nations Championship. He played in all six of Zimbabwe's matches and helped the team to a fourth-place finish after being defeated by Nigeria by 1–0. Since the 2014 African Nations Championship, Phiri has made a further seven appearances for his nation, with five of them coming in qualifying for the 2017 Africa Cup of Nations. He has scored twice.

Career statistics

International
.

International goals
. Scores and results list Zimbabwe's goal tally first.

Honours

Individual
 Soccer Star of the Year: 2015

References

1989 births
Living people
Association football midfielders
Zimbabwean footballers
Chicken Inn F.C. players
Lamontville Golden Arrows F.C. players
Zimbabwe A' international footballers
2014 African Nations Championship players
2017 Africa Cup of Nations players
2019 Africa Cup of Nations players
Zimbabwe international footballers
Zimbabwean expatriate footballers
Expatriate soccer players in South Africa
Zimbabwean expatriate sportspeople in South Africa